is a mythical practice of senicide in Japan, whereby an infirm or elderly relative was carried to a mountain, or some other remote, desolate place, and left there to die. Kunio Yanagita concluded that the ubasute folklore comes from India’s Buddhist mythology. According to the Kodansha Illustrated Encyclopedia of Japan, ubasute "is the subject of legend, but…does not seem ever to have been a common custom."

Folklore
In one Buddhist allegory, a son carries his mother up a mountain on his back. During the journey, she stretches out her arms, catching the twigs and scattering them in their wake, so that her son will be able to find the way home.

A poem commemorates the story:

In popular culture
 The practice is discussed in some detail in Radiolab episode #305 Mortality. Ubasute sometimes appears as a metaphor for contemporary Japan's treatment of the elderly, who are noted for above-average suicide rates.
 The practice of ubasute is explored at length in the Japanese novel The Ballad of Narayama (1956) by Shichirō Fukazawa. The novel was the basis for three films: Keisuke Kinoshita's The Ballad of Narayama (1958), Korean director Kim Ki-young's Goryeojang (1963), and Shohei Imamura's The Ballad of Narayama, which won the Palme d'Or in 1983.
 The Old Law, a 17th-century tragicomedy written by Thomas Middleton, William Rowley, and Philip Massinger, as well as Anthony Trollope's 1882 dystopian novel The Fixed Period both explore the concept of ubasute in a Western context.
 The characters of Christopher Buckley's 2007 novel Boomsday introduce the concept of ubasute as a political ploy to stave off the insolvency of social security as more and more of the aging US population reaches retirement age, angering the Religious Right and Baby Boomers.
 The concept of ubasute forms the basis of the storyline for the Star Trek: The Next Generation episode "Half a Life".
 In episode 103 of Dinosaurs they describe a ubasute-like dinosaur custom where elders are hurled off a cliff into a tar pit at the age of 72.
 The musical Pacific Overtures contains a reference to ubasute. During the song 'Four Black Dragons', as a city is being evacuated for fear of an American naval force, a panicked merchant is willing to abandon his aged mother during the evacuation, but the merchant is reminded that his son could do the same when the merchant is just as old. The merchant reluctantly picks up his mother and carries her on his back. 
 Episode 19 of Folktales from Japan depicts this tale.
 The Decemberists song "I Don't Mind" has a depiction of ubasute – "So here's you with your mom on your back, going into the woods..."

Places

 Obasute Station, Chikuma, Nagano Prefecture, Japan
 According to folklore, the Aokigahara forest at the base of Mount Fuji was once one of such sites, where its reputation as a suicide site might have originated.

Similar practice in other cultures
 Senicide
 Granny dumping
 Lapot
 %C3%84ttestupa

References

Further reading
 Japan, An Illustrated Encyclopedia, Kodansha Ltd., Tokyo, 1993, p. 1121

External links
 What Japan can Offer to International Bioethics
 Folktale in Japanese, English version: 

Japanese folklore
Senicide
Death in Japan
Old age in Japan